Zhang Xingdong (born April 1938) is a Chinese biomedical scientist and professor at Sichuan University. He is the President of the International Union of Societies for Biomaterials Science and Engineering (IUSBSE), and Honorary President of the Chinese Society for Biomaterials (CSBM).

Biography
Zhang was born in Nanchong, Sichuan, in April 1938. After high school in 1960, he studied, then taught, at what is now Sichuan University.

In 2007 he was elected an academician of the Chinese Academy of Engineering (CAE). On February 6, 2014, he was elected a foreign associate of the US National Academy of Engineering (NAE).

In March 2017, he received the honorary doctorate of science from Macao University of Science and Technology.

Selected papers

References

External links
  Biography of Zhang Xingdong on Northeastern University College of Engineering
 Zhang Xingdong on International Collage of Fellows

1938 births
People from Nanchong
Living people
Sichuan University alumni
Academic staff of Sichuan University
Members of the Chinese Academy of Engineering
Foreign associates of the National Academy of Engineering
Scientists from Sichuan
Engineers from Sichuan
Chinese bioengineers